Robson Arms is a Canadian television series that began airing on CTV on June 17, 2005 and ended on June 30, 2008. Robson Arms is a co-production between Vancouver-based Omni Film Productions Limited and Halifax's Creative Atlantic Communications.

The show is a comedy-drama (dramedy) anthology organized around the Robson Arms, an apartment building in Vancouver, at the fictional address of 951 Pendrell Street. Each of the show's episodes focuses principally on a different tenant of the building, although the core cast members interact in minor roles throughout the series. In each episode, the Troubadours comment on the storyline through song.

The show was created to fulfill a licensing requirement of CTV's Vancouver station, CIVT, which originally promised, as an independent station, to produce 20 episodes of an anthology series entitled The Storytellers. Only ten such episodes were produced. The Canadian Radio-television and Telecommunications Commission (CRTC) did not agree that CIVT's new network programming supplanted this commitment and asked the station to fulfill its promise. CTV believed the anthology would be more successful as a series with common characters, and Robson Arms was the result.

Two of the show's regular cast members, Gabrielle Miller and Fred Ewanuick, appeared in this series concurrent with their continuing roles in another CTV production, Corner Gas.

The series currently airs in reruns on CTV's secondary CTV Two system.

Cast and characters 
The season(s) during which each actor has been included in the main cast are marked in black. White square means the actor doesn't appear in that season at all.

Robson Arms, the Building 

The structure used as the apartment building is not located in Vancouver's West End, but rather is located at 951 Boundary Road on the east side of the City of Vancouver. It is called Taylor Manor, and is on the City of Vancouver's historic building registry. The skyscraper skyline behind the building is superimposed to make it look like it is located in Vancouver's West End.

Episodes

Season 1 (2005)

Season 2 (2007)

Season 3 (2008)

Home media
Video Service Corp has released all 3 seasons on DVD in Region 1.

References

External links

 Robson Arms
 

2000s Canadian anthology television series
CTV Television Network original programming
CTV 2 original programming
2005 Canadian television series debuts
2008 Canadian television series endings
CTV Comedy Channel original programming
Television shows set in Vancouver
Television shows filmed in Vancouver
2000s Canadian comedy-drama television series
Television series by Bell Media